
The War Medal is a Norwegian war decoration for service during Second World War, and later for meritous service during war.

Criteria
The Norwegian War Medal was instituted by King Haakon VII of Norway by Royal Decree on 23 May 1941 with the addition of the Royal Decree of 13 November 1942. It may be awarded to Norwegian and foreign members of the military who in a meritorious way have participated in the Second World War for Norway. The War Medal may also awarded posthumously to all Norwegians and foreigners who fought in the Norwegian forces and merchant marine and fell for the Norwegian Resistance.

The distribution ceased in 1951, but in 1979 it was determined by Royal decree that this medal was to be awarded Norwegian and foreign seamen who served on Norwegian Shipping and Trade Mission (Nortraship) vessels during World War II for 18 months, or on board Royal Norwegian Navy vessels.

The criteria were again changed in 2012.  The medal can be awarded to Norwegians who have served meritously during war, for Norway.  It has been awarded for war against ISIL.

Appearance
The obverse side of the medal features the portrait of King Haakon VII of Norway, his name and motto Alt for Norge. The reverse features a wreath, the inscription Krigsmedalje and the king's monogram. The medal is in bronze and the ribbon is in the colours of the Royal Standard: red and yellow. If a recipient earns the medal more than once, up to three stars may be attached to the ribbon. Along with the medal comes with a certificate, signed by the king. The medal was first produced at the firm Spink & Son in London.

Recipients 

 Arne Austeen
 Johan Beichmann
 Svein Blindheim
 Johannes Brun (officer)
 Raymond Couraud
 Marius Eriksen Jr.
 Erik Gjems-Onstad
 Sverre Granlund
 Gunnar Halle (officer)
 Nils Uhlin Hansen
 Sverre Haug
 Rolf Hauge (army officer)
 Kasper Idland
 Margit Johnsen
 Dagfinn Kjeholt
 Erik Sture Larre
 Leif Larsen
 Hakon Lunde
 Helge Mehre
 Fredrik Meyer
 Edward Evans, 1st Baron Mountevans
 Hugo Munthe-Kaas
 Håkon Nilsen
 Olav V of Norway
 Oluf Reed-Olsen
 Boy Rist
 Gerard Broadmead Roope
 Annæus Schjødt Jr.
 Inge Steensland
 Skule Storheill
 Anne Margrethe Strømsheim
 Edvard Tallaksen
 Leif Tronstad
 Ernst Ullring
 Leif Utne
 Sigurd Valvatne
 War Medal (Norway)
 Erling Welle-Strand
 Dick Zeiner-Henriksen

See also
 Orders, decorations, and medals of Norway

References

Military awards and decorations of Norway
Awards established in 1941
1941 establishments in the United Kingdom
Military awards and decorations of World War II
Awards disestablished in 1951
Awards established in 2012